The British Association for Applied Linguistics (BAAL) is a learned society, based in the UK, which provides a forum for people interested in language and applied linguistics.

BAAL organises regular meetings of its members at various venues in the UK, publishes conference proceedings, issues a regular newsletter and awards student scholarships. There is an elected Executive Committee (EC) that represents the interests of members. The current Chair is Professor Zhu Hua of UCL Institute of Education.

BAAL has an international membership of over 1200 members and is a registered charity in the UK (Charity number 246800).

Activities
BAAL organises scientific meetings, and publishes a newsletter and conference proceedings. It supports applied linguistics activity, special interest groups and an annual book prize. It brings together the applied linguistics community via BAALmail, its dedicated webmail list, through which members share and discuss applied linguistics-related news, achievements and opportunities.

BAAL forges and maintains close links to institutions and organisations with a vested interest in applied linguistics. It also sends representatives to national and international meetings of interest to our members. BAAL plays an active role within organisations including:

 AcSS (Academy of Social Sciences)
 AILA (Association Internationale de Linguistique Appliquée / International Association of Applied Linguistics)
 British Academy
 British Council
 CLiE (The Committee for Linguistics in Education) - a joint committee of the Linguistics Association of Great Britain (LAGB) and BAAL
 UCGAL (The University Council of General and Applied Linguistics)
 UCML (The University Council of Modern Languages)

BAAL is also officially represented on the Advisory Board of the journal Applied Linguistics (Oxford University Press).

Annual Conference
Since 1967 BAAL has held an annual conference. At the conference three prizes are awarded: the annual Book Prize, the Richard Pemberton prize for the best postgraduate student paper and a prize for the best poster presentation.

Recent conferences and conference themes

 52nd – 29–31 August 2019, Manchester Metropolitan University: ‘Broadening the Horizons of Applied Linguistics’.  
 51st – 6–8 September 2018, York St John University: ‘Taking risks in applied linguistics’.   
 50th – 31 August-2 September 2017, University of Leeds: ‘Diversity in Applied Linguistics: Opportunities, challenges, questions’.    
 49th – 1–3 September 2016, Anglia Ruskin University, Cambridge: ‘Taking stock of Applied Linguistics: Where are we now?’    
 48th – 3–5 September 2015, Aston University, Birmingham: ‘Breaking Theory: New Directions’.

Recent BAAL Book Prize winners

 2018 – Alastair Pennycook (2018). Posthumanist Applied Linguistics. Routledge.
 2017 – Ingrid Piller (2016). Linguistic Diversity and Social Justice: An Introduction to Applied Sociolinguistics. Oxford University Press.
 2016 – Mario Saraceni (2015). World Englishes: A Critical Analysis. Bloomsbury Academic.
 2015 – O. Garcia & Li Wei (2014). Translanguaging: Language, Bilingualism and Education. Palgrave Macmillan.
 2014 – Suresh Canagarajah (2013). Translingual practice: Global Englishes and Cosmopolitan Relations. Routledge.

Special Interest Groups (SIGs)
BAAL has a number of Special Interest Groups (SIGs), which meet regularly and provide opportunities for researchers to share, promote and develop work within specific areas of applied linguistics.

The current SIGs are:

 Corpus Linguistics
 English as an Additional Language [EAL]
 Health and Science Communication
 Intercultural Communication
 Language, Gender and Sexuality
 Language and New Media
 Language in Africa
 Language Learning and Teaching
 Language Policy
 Linguistic Ethnography Forum
 Linguistics and Knowledge about Language in Education (LKALE)
 Multilingualism
 Professional, Academic and Work-based Literacies (PAWBL)
 Testing, Evaluation and Assessment
 Vocabulary Studies

History

BAAL was founded in the 1960s, as interest increased in the science of linguistics and its practical applications - for example, in language teaching and learning.

BAAL's creation was the result of a proposal by Peter Strevens, recently appointed to a new Chair in Applied Linguistics at the University of Essex. At a preliminary meeting of interested parties at Birkbeck College in July 1965, a narrower remit was discussed than the wider set of issues that the Association would ultimately concern itself with. Initially, it was suggested that it might focus on language teaching and machine translation, but the first full meeting in 1967 at the University of Reading agreed to broaden the scope. BAAL emerged as the UK affiliate of AILA, with Pit Corder its first Chair.

Membership was narrowly defined in the early years, but a feeling that the Association could afford to widen recruitment was apparent by the early 1970s. In 1985, a requirement for formal qualifications, already flexible, was dropped; and today anyone can join.

The BAAL Archive is housed in the Centre for Applied Linguistics, University of Warwick.

See also
Language acquisition

References

British Association for Applied Linguistics (1997) Notes on the History of the British Association for Applied Linguistics 1967-1997.
Trim J (1988) Applied Linguistics in Society. In Grunwell P (ed.) Applied Linguistics in Society: British Studies in Applied Linguistics 3. London: Centre for Information on Language Teaching and Research. .

External links
British Association for Applied Linguistics - official site
Applied Linguistics - journal published by Oxford University Press, in collaboration with BAAL, the American Association for Applied Linguistics and the International Association of Applied Linguistics

Professional associations based in the United Kingdom
Scientific societies based in the United Kingdom
Linguistic societies
1960s establishments in the United Kingdom
Organizations established in the 1960s
Scholarly communication